Boadi is a town in Ghana located 15 kilometres from the centre of Kumasi. It is a dormitory town, serving mainly as a residential area for workers in various companies in Kumasi.

Boundaries
The town is bordered to the north by Ayeduase, to the west by Emina, to the east by Kentinkrono and to the south by Anwomaso.

References

Populated places in Kumasi Metropolitan Assembly